Dieter Frey (born 31 October 1972) is a German former professional footballer who played as a defender or midfielder.

Career
Frey began his professional career with Bayern Munich, making his debut against VfB Leipzig in the 1993–94 season. He never established himself as a first-team regular, however, and left in 1996 to join SC Freiburg. After one year at Freiburg he moved to Werder Bremen, but injuries restricted him to just 30 appearances in four seasons. In 2001, he returned south, joining 1. FC Nürnberg, where he briefly served as captain, but his injury troubles returned, and he retired in 2004 after the club's relegation to the 2. Bundesliga.

Personal life
After his retirement from playing Frey studied at university and became a mathematics teacher.

Honours
Bayern Munich
 Bundesliga: 1993–94
 UEFA Cup: 1995–96

Werder Bremen
 DFB-Pokal: 1998–99; runner-up 1999–2000
 UEFA Intertoto Cup: 1998

1. FC Nürnberg
 2. Bundesliga: 2003–04

References

External links
 

1972 births
Living people
German footballers
Germany under-21 international footballers
Association football midfielders
Association football defenders
Association football utility players
FC Augsburg players
FC Bayern Munich footballers
FC Bayern Munich II players
SC Freiburg players
SV Werder Bremen players
1. FC Nürnberg players
Bundesliga players
UEFA Cup winning players
West German footballers
People from Straubing-Bogen
Sportspeople from Lower Bavaria
Footballers from Bavaria